Maja e Kakisë a mountain in the north of Albania. Maja e Kakisë is 2,357m high. It is located in the south of the large Accursed Mountains range not far from the smaller Maja e Ershellit which is found even more towards the south bordering the long Drin River.

References

Mountains of Albania
Accursed Mountains